Saint Sarkis Church (Surp Sarkis Yekeghetsi) is an Armenian Apostolic church in Baron Avak neighborhood of Tabriz, Iran. St. Sarkis was built with funding from the Petrossian family. Built in 1845, the church is in the courtyard of Tamarian Armenian school building, which was extended out to add the Sahakian School. The Haykazyan school was located across from these, but was closed after being damaged in the Iran-Iraq war.

See also
Iranian Armenians
List of Armenian churches in Iran
Shoghakat Church of Tabriz
Saint Mary Church of Tabriz

References

Tourist attractions in Tabriz
Architecture in Iran
Churches in Tabriz
Armenian Apostolic churches in Iran